Paul Bergmann is an American football tight end who played in the United States Football League and N.F.L.

Early years
Bergmann's football career began on the receiving end of John Elway's passes under legendary coach Jack Neumeier at Granada Hills Charter High School. Bergmann was a All-League, All-Valley, All-L.A. City receiver and linebacker. In the 1979 East vs. West Shrine All Star game Bergmann caught 9 passes and touchdowns from former teammate N.F.L. Hall of Fame John Elway and future UCLA Hall of Fame QB Tom Ramsey. Elway went on to Stanford, and Bergmann went to play at UCLA, on a full scholarship.

College
Bergmann lettered for the UCLA Bruins in 1982 and 1983. He was the recipient of the UCLA N.N. Sugarman Memorial Award for Best Leadership On Offense 1983, the UCLA George W. Dickerson Award for Outstanding Offensive Player in the 1983 USC game defeating the Trojans 27-17 for the PAC-10 Championship and a trip to the Rose Bowl. He was a 1st Team All-Pac-10 selection, UPI 1st Team All-West Coast, a 2nd Team AP and a UPI All-American selection. In those seasons, UCLA's record was 10-1-1, 7-4-1. Bergmann has 85 career receptions catching passes in 24 consecutive games, for 1076 receiving yards and 5 touchdowns. His season receptions and cumulative receptions were all-time UCLA records for a Tight-End. 

Bergmann was a starting member of UCLA's 1983 Rose Bowl, where he led all receivers with 6 receptions defeating the Michigan Wolverines and the 1984 Rose Bowl Championship, where he caught the first touchdown pass of the game and 4 receptions thrown by Rick Neuheisel. Quarterback Rick Neuheisel would be the Rose Bowl MVP in the defeat of the Illinois Fighting Illini 45-9.

Professional career 
Bergmann was drafted into the NFL in 1984, as the 8th pick in the 1st round of the 1984 NFL Supplemental Draft of USFL and CFL Players by the Indianapolis Colts, and was also drafted into playing with the United States Football League’s Jacksonville Bulls in 1984. He was named Offensive M.V.P. Bergmann with 48 receptions for 647yds - 13.5yd avg - 3 tds. He then played with the USFL Oakland Invaders in 1985 and caught his last pass of his USFL career in the 1985 Championship game versus the Philadelphia Stars. Bergmann eventually moved on to the NFL to play with Kansas City Chiefs for two years 1986-1987 before a shoulder dislocation and surgery ended his career in 1988. He resides in Ojai, California, with his wife. Bergmann was ordained by the Evangelical Church Alliance, Bradley Illinois on October 12th, 1995 and then by Ojai Valley Community Church February 1st 1998 where he served as a progressive Senior Pastor 1998-2021.

References

Year of birth missing (living people)
Living people
Players of American football from Los Angeles
American football wide receivers
UCLA Bruins football players